Juchitán  is one of the 81 municipalities of Guerrero, in south-western Mexico. The municipal seat lies at Juchitán. Founded in 2004, it is one of the newest municipalities in Guerrero.

As of 2005, the municipality had a total population of 6,240.

The municipality of Juchitán was created on 5 March 2004 with its excision from the municipality of Azoyú; as of February 2008, it was Guerrero's newest municipality.

References

Municipalities of Guerrero